The 2013–14 Auburn Tigers women's basketball team will represent Auburn University during the 2013–14 NCAA Division I women's basketball season. The Tigers, led by second year head coach Terri Williams-Flournoy, play their home games at Auburn Arena and are a members of the Southeastern Conference.

Roster

Schedule

|-
!colspan=9| Regular Season

|-
!colspan=9| 2014 SEC women's basketball tournament

Source

See also
 2013–14 Auburn Tigers men's basketball team

References

Auburn Tigers women's basketball seasons
Auburn
Auburn Tigers women's basketball
Auburn Tigers women's basketball
2014 Women's National Invitation Tournament participants